Hashemabad (also Romanized as Hāshemābād; also known as Hāshimābād) is a village in Fathabad Rural District, in the Central District of Khatam County, Yazd Province, Iran. At the 2006 census, its population was 192, in 55 families.

References 

Populated places in Khatam County